The 2009 Women's Twenty20 Cup was the inaugural cricket Women's Twenty20 Cup tournament. It took place in July, with 32 teams taking part: 30 county teams plus Wales and Scotland. Surrey Women won the Twenty20 Cup, as champions of Division One. The tournament ran alongside the 50-over 2009 Women's County Championship.

Competition format

Teams played matches within a series of divisions with the winners of the top division being crowned the Champions. Matches were played using a Twenty20 format.

The championship worked on a points system with positions within the divisions being based on the total points. Points were awarded as follows:

Win: 2 points. 
Tie: 1 point. 
Loss: 0 points.
Abandoned/Cancelled: 1 point.

Teams

The 2009 Women's Twenty20 Cup was divided into eight divisions, Division One to Division Eight. Teams played each other once.

Division One 

 Source: ECB Women's Twenty20 Cup

Division Two 

 Source: ECB Women's Twenty20 Cup

Division Three 

 Source: ECB Women's Twenty20 Cup

Division Four 

 Source: ECB Women's Twenty20 Cup

Division Five 

 Source: ECB Women's Twenty20 Cup

Division Six 

All games abandoned due to rain.

 Source: ECB Women's Twenty20 Cup

Division Seven 

All games abandoned due to rain.

 Source: ECB Women's Twenty20 Cup

Division Eight 

 Source: ECB Women's Twenty20 Cup

Statistics

Most runs

Source: CricketArchive

Most wickets

Source: CricketArchive

References

Women's Twenty20 Cup
 
2009 in Scottish cricket
cricket
cricket